Highway 463 (AR 463, Ark. 463 and Hwy. 463) is a north–south state highway in northeast Arkansas. The route of  runs from Highway 14 very near I-555 at Payneway north to I-555/US 63B in Jonesboro. The route is a redesignation of former U.S. Route 63, which has since been rerouted onto US 49.

Route description
Highway 463 runs along a range line north to intersect Highway 214 before crossing the freeway and entering Trumann. Highway 463 intersects Highway 69S before passing the Maxie Theatre on the National Register of Historic Places. Further north, AR 463 has junctions with AR 198, AR 69, and AR 214 before exiting Trumann and entering Craighead County.

The route has an overlap with Highway 158 in Bay and a junction with I-555 before entering Jonesboro and terminating at I-555/US 63B.

Major intersections

See also

 List of state highways in Arkansas
 Arkansas Highway 163

Notes

References

External links

463
Transportation in Craighead County, Arkansas
Transportation in Poinsett County, Arkansas
Jonesboro, Arkansas
U.S. Route 63